Sri Lanka has competed in the first three editions of the Lusophone Games.

Overall performance of Sri Lanka in the Lusophone Games.

Medal table by sports

See also 
 2006 Lusophone Games
 2009 Lusophone Games
 2014 Lusophone Games

Nations at the Lusofonia Games